The fringelip snake-eel (Cirrhimuraena playfairii) is an eel in the family Ophichthidae (worm/snake eels). It was described by Albert Günther in 1870. It is a marine, tropical eel which is known from the Indo-Pacific, including Zanzibar, Tanzania, Kosi Bay, South Africa, and the Hawaiian Islands. Its lifestyle is mostly benthic but it sometimes swims at the surface. It is olive brown in colour, with lighter colouring in the ventral region.

References

Ophichthidae
Fish described in 1870
Taxa named by Albert Günther